"Straight to the Bank" is the first single from 50 Cent's third album, Curtis. The song is produced by Ty Fyffe, with additional production from Dr. Dre. Tony Yayo contributes with a laughing effect in the chorus. This stuttered laughing effect was then later copied by Lupe Fiasco on his song, The Coolest, from Lupe Fiasco's The Cool.

Background

Six days after the song was leaked on the Internet, it debuted at number 48 on the Hot R&B/Hip-Hop Songs and peaked at number 30 weeks later. "Straight to the Bank" debuted at  #32 on the Billboard Hot 100 on the week of May 26, 2007. It remained on the chart for 3 weeks, before falling off. 50 Cent performed the song live for the first time at the highly touted WBC Super Welterweight Championship fight between Floyd Mayweather Jr. and Oscar De La Hoya on May 5, 2007, at the MGM Grand in Las Vegas, Nevada, while leading Mayweather's entourage into the ring. At its highest, "Straight to the Bank" hit number 3 on the iTunes single chart; however, due to the Curtis album being delayed, the song was removed from the iTunes library.

Music video
The music video debuted on MTV on May 17, 2007, after the "Amusement Park" video, which was released on May 16, 2007. On December 31, 2007, the music video appeared at number 83 on BET's Notarized: Top 100 Videos of 2007 countdown. The music video features cameos by G-Unit members Spider Loc and Tony Yayo, who contributes uncredited vocals to the song. The song has over 60 million views on YouTube.

Remixes
An official remix was made featuring up and coming G-Unit Records artist Young Hot Rod. The song featured an altered, slower beat. The remix clocked in at 3 minutes and 44 seconds and was introduction to Hot Rod as an artist. A second remix was made featuring 2Pac and Daz Dillinger. Both guest star's verses were taken from previously released songs by both artists. The main remix is the song "I Get Money", which was originally supposed to be a remix to "Straight to the Bank", but due to major publicity the song became a single and song by itself.

Track listing
 2-Track
 "Straight to the Bank" - 3:11
 "Straight to the Bank" (instrumental) - 3:11

 Maxi CD
 "Straight to the Bank" - 3:11
 "Straight to the Bank" (instrumental) - 3:11
 "Straight to the Bank" (a cappella) - 3:11
 "Straight to the Bank" (CD-rom video)

Chart performance

References

2007 singles
50 Cent songs
Music videos directed by Benny Boom
Songs written by 50 Cent
Song recordings produced by Dr. Dre
Shady Records singles
Aftermath Entertainment singles
Interscope Records singles
2007 songs